Brandon Jacob Uranowitz is an American stage and screen actor. He is best known for his roles as Adam Hochberg in the musical An American in Paris (2014–15) and Mendel Weisenbachfeld in the 2016 Broadway revival of Falsettos. A three-time Tony Award nominee, he received nominations for Best Featured Actor in a Musical for these performances in addition to a 2019 nomination for Best Featured Actor in a Play for his performance in Burn This. His other Broadway credits include Baby, It's You! (2011), Prince of Broadway (2017), and The Band's Visit (2018).

Early life
Uranowitz grew up in West Orange, New Jersey and attended the nearby Montclair Kimberley Academy. He is from a Jewish family and had a Bar Mitzvah.

He began performing at age six and studied at Performers Theatre Workshop. In the mid-1990s, he was a working child actor; professional roles included an ensemble member in Evita at the Paper Mill Playhouse (1996) and a swing in A Christmas Carol at Madison Square Garden. In 1997, he assumed the role of Little Boy in the world premiere of Ragtime in Toronto. He was also member of The Broadway Kids, a musical revue and recording project; he performed live off-Broadway and appears on the 1998 album The Broadway Kids Back on Broadway. Of Uranowitz's contribution as part of the ensemble cast, The New York Times wrote he "was a testament to youthful enthusiasm and lung power".

He attended New York University and graduated in 2008 with a degree in theater arts from their Tisch School of the Arts.

Career

2006–2013: Early career and Broadway debut
Uranowitz resumed his acting career while training at NYU; early on, he held the roles of Richard in Richard III and the King of France in All's Well That Ends Well at Classical Studio, Cardinal Bellarmin in Galileo at The Skirball Center (2007), and Dante in Only Children at The Abe Burrows Theatre.

Following graduation, he played the role of Feste in Twelfth Night at the Kirk Theatre off-Broadway (2009) and the role of Eugene in Brighton Beach Memoirs / Broadway Bound in 2010 at the Old Globe Theatre in San Diego. Of Uranowitz's appearance as Feste in Twelfth Night, MusicOMH wrote "Uranowitz rocks it... ...playing the fool character with restrained glee," PlayShakespeare.com wrote, "Brandon Uranowitz’ effortless command of the language and, again, his willingness to explore his characters’ depth makes him absolutely spellbinding." For his performance, Uranowitz received a PlayShakespeare.com Falstaff Award nomination for Best Supporting Performance, Male.

His first role in a major production was as an ensemble member and understudy of Mark in the national tour of Rent. Uranowitz made his Broadway debut in the 2011 jukebox musical Baby It's You!. He played the role of Stanley, the blind composer and son of Florence Greenberg as played by Beth Leavel. In their review of the musical, Variety noted that the "show is continually perked up by... ...Brandon Uranowitz (as a long-suffering press guy and Goldberg's blind son)."

In 2013, he was cast in Michael Kahn's Washington, D.C. production of Torch Song Trilogy. He starred as Arnold in the four-hour unabridged version of the play and was nominated for the Helen Hayes Award for Outstanding Lead Actor in a Resident Play.

During this time, Uranowitz has had minor appearances in the television series Law & Order: CI, As the World Turns, and Inside Amy Schumer.

2014–present: Breakthrough and acclaim 
In 2014, he joined the original cast of the stage adaption of An American in Paris as composer Adam Hochberg. The show premiered in Paris at Théâtre du Châtelet in December 2014 and transferred to Broadway, opening in April 2015. He departed the show on August 7, 2016. The show was Uranowitz's breakthrough performance and netted him his first Tony Award nomination. He also portrayed Mrs. White in the 30th Anniversary one time tribute performance of the classic film Clue in December 2015.

Uranowitz joined the first revival of 1992 musical Falsettos, which opened on Broadway at the Walter Kerr Theatre on October 27, 2016, as a limited engagement. He portrayed Mendel, a psychiatrist, opposite Christian Borle as Marvin, Andrew Rannells as Whizzer, and Stephanie J. Block as Trina. For his performance, he received a 2017 Drama Desk Award nomination for Best Featured Actor in a Musical and a Tony Award nomination for Best Featured Actor in a Musical. His turn as Mendel in Falsettos received rave reviews. He was called "warmly funny and convincingly neurotic" as Mendel by the New York Times, "wholly endearing" by Entertainment Weekly, and The Hollywood Reporter said "Uranowitz is a worthy successor to the wonderful Chip Zien in the original production. He flirts with the stereotypical view of a Jewish therapist only marginally less messed-up than his patients, while also finding the truth in a compassionate man who has to convince himself of his right to be happy". Vulture said that Uranowitz offered "an unusually sexy Mendel".

Uranowitz appeared in the revue Prince of Broadway, which opened on Broadway in August 2017 and closed in October 2017. The revue featured the work of the director and producer Harold Prince. Beginning in October 2018, he performed for four months in The Band's Visit on Broadway, replacing John Cariani. He subsequently played Larry in a limited run of Burn This on Broadway, opposite Adam Driver and Keri Russell. For his role, Uranowitz received nominations for the Drama Desk Award and Tony Award for Best Featured Actor in a Play.

In Fall 2019, it was announced that he would star in a limited-run off-Broadway production of Stephen Sondheim's Assassins at the Classic Stage Company in Spring 2020. The production was postponed indefinitely due to the global pandemic. In 2020, he took part in the amfAR COVID-19 relief benefit The Great Work Begins, a live streamed event featuring scenes from Angels in America. He performed in the role of Louis Ironside.

Some of his screen acting credits during this time include a three episode arc in 2018 on The Marvelous Mrs. Maisel as Buzz Goldberg, a Catskills activities director, and the 2021 Billy Crystal feature film Here Today.

Personal life
He is openly gay.  As of 2011, Uranowitz is in a relationship with actor Zachary Prince. They met at the audition for Baby It's You! and Prince was subsequently cast as Uranowitz's understudy.

Acting credits

Theatre 
Selected credits

Concerts and readings

Film

Television

Discography

Cast recordings 

 2011: Baby It's You! (Original Cast Recording); featured on 2 tracks
 2015: An American in Paris (Original Broadway Cast Recording); featured on 6 tracks
 2016: Falsettos (2016 Broadway Cast Recording); featured on 14 tracks
 2018: Prince of Broadway (Original Broadway Cast Recording); featured on 3 tracks

Awards and nominations

References

External links
 
 

Living people
American male musical theatre actors
Tisch School of the Arts alumni
Male actors from New Jersey
Montclair Kimberley Academy alumni
People from Livingston, New Jersey
People from West Orange, New Jersey
American male television actors
American male film actors
21st-century American male actors
American male stage actors
American gay actors
1986 births
LGBT Jews
Jewish American male actors